Michał Ryszard Żewłakow (born 22 April 1976) is a Polish former footballer who played as a defender. He captained the Poland national team and is its third most capped player ever. Besides Poland, he has played in Belgium, Greece, and Turkey.

Club career

Early career in Poland
Born in Warsaw in April 1976, Żewłakow spent eight years with Polonia Warsaw and broke into the first team in 1996–97.

Belgium
Żewłakow was loaned to Belgium's KSK Beveren in October 1998 before signing – together with his twin brother Marcin – for R.E. Mouscron for a combined fee of €485,000. Żewłakow went on to become a key player, helping the club reach the 2002 Belgian Cup final.

Anderlecht
After following coach Hugo Broos to R.S.C. Anderlecht, in his second season he made his UEFA Champions League debut as Anderlecht wrested back the Belgian title from Club Brugge. The next season, he lost his place but regained it in 2005–06 as Anderlecht won the league again.

Olympiacos
In the summer 2006, Żewłakow moved to Olympiacos on a free transfer.

Ankaragücü
At the end of the 2009–10 season, Olympiacos gave Żewłakow a low offer, so he preferred not to renew his contract. On 16 June 2010 Ankaragücü signed him on a free transfer.

Legia Warsaw
In June 2011, Żewłakow joined Polish club Legia Warsaw on a one-year contract.

International career
The Poland national team's first-choice left-back during qualifying for the 2002 FIFA World Cup, Żewłakow was the only player to appear in all ten of his country's qualifying matches. He played in two games at the 2002 World Cup and was a regular in qualifying for UEFA EURO 2004 and the 2006 World Cup, where he again appeared three times in the finals in Germany.

Personal life
Michał Żewłakow has a twin brother, Marcin, who played as a striker. They became the first twins ever to play together for Poland when they were picked in the starting lineup to face France in February 2000 and were teammates at the 2002 World Cup.

Career statistics
Scores and results list Poland's goal tally first, score column indicates score after each Żewłakow goal.

Honours
Anderlecht
 Belgian League: 2003–04, 2005–06

Olympiacos
 Greek Super League: 2007, 2008, 2009
 Greek Cup: 2008, 2009
 Greek Super Cup: 2007

Legia Warsaw
 Polish Ekstraklasa: 2012–13
 Polish Cup: 2011–12, 2012–13

See also
 List of footballers with 100 or more caps

References

External links
 
 National team stats on the website of the Polish Football Association 

1976 births
Living people
Polish footballers
Footballers from Warsaw
Association football fullbacks
Poland international footballers
FIFA Century Club
2002 FIFA World Cup players
2006 FIFA World Cup players
UEFA Euro 2008 players
Belgian Pro League players
Polonia Warsaw players
K.S.K. Beveren players
R.E. Mouscron players
R.S.C. Anderlecht players
Olympiacos F.C. players
MKE Ankaragücü footballers
Legia Warsaw players
Hutnik Warsaw players
Ekstraklasa players
Super League Greece players
Süper Lig players
Polish expatriate footballers
Polish expatriate sportspeople in Belgium
Expatriate footballers in Belgium
Polish expatriate sportspeople in Greece
Expatriate footballers in Greece
Polish expatriate sportspeople in Turkey
Expatriate footballers in Turkey
Twin sportspeople
Polish twins